The following is a list of parks and open spaces in Merseyside, England. Covering the areas of Knowsley, Liverpool, Sefton and St Helens.

Knowsley

List is referenced from Knowsley Metropolitan Borough Councils' website.

Acornfield Plantation 
Bowring Park
Court Hey Park
Halewood Park
Henley Park                        
Huyton Lane Wetland
Jubilee Park          
McGoldrick Park
Millbrook Park Millennium Green
Mill Farm park
Sawpit Park
Stadt Moers Park
St Chads Gardens
St Johns Millennium Green
Valley Millennium Green
Webster Park
Whitestone Millennium Green
Wignall Park

Liverpool

List is referenced from Liverpool City Councils' website.

Abercromby Square
Allerton Tower Park
Anfield Crematorium Gardens
Belle Vale Park
Calderstones Park
Canalside Park
Chavasse Park
Church of St Luke
Clarke's Gardens
Croxteth Hall and Country Park
Devonfield Garden
Everton Park
Falkner Square
Gambier Terrace
Greenbank Park
Newsham Park
Otterspool Promenade and Park
Princes Park
Reynolds Park
Sefton Park
Speke and Garston Coastal Reserve
Speke Hall
Springwood Crematorium Gardens
St. James Mount and Gardens
St John's Gardens
St. Nicholas Church Gardens
Stanley Park
Sudley Estate
Walton Hall Park
Warbreck Park
Wavertree Botanic Park and Gardens
Wavertree Playground ("The Mystery")
Woolton Woods and Camphill

St Helens

List is referenced from St Helens Councils' website.

Mesnes Park
Willow Park
Taylor Park
Thatto Heath Park
Sherdley Park
Sutton Park
Sankey Valley Country Park
Siding Lane Local Nature Reserve
Clinkham Wood Community Woodland Local Nature Reserve
Bankes Park
Downall Croft
The Duckeries
Nanny Goat Park
Gaskell Park
Victoria Park
Haresfinch Park
Queens Park

Sefton

List is referenced from Sefton Councils' website.

 Hesketh Park, Southport
 Botanic Gardens, Southport
 Victoria Park, Crosby
 Derby Park, Bootle
 North Park, Bootle
 South Park Bootle
 Bedford Park
 South Marine Park
 Kings Gardens, Bootle
 Kings Gardens, Southport
 Floral Hall Gardens
 Princes Park
 Crescent Gardens
 Adelaide Gardens
 Beach Lawns
 Marine Gardens, Crosby
 Alexandra Park and War Memorial
 Coronation Park (All Areas)
 Moorside Park (All Areas)   
 Centenary Gardens
 Kings Gardens
 Hapsford Road (Open Area)
 Moss Lane Bowling Green (Menai Road Park)
 Deepdale Park      
 Johnsons Bowling Green (Linacre Hub)
 Poets Park
 Melanear Park      
 St Marys Gardens
 Killen Green Park
 Runnels Lane Park
 Abbeyfield Park
 Giro Park
 Marian Park
 Copy Farm Wildlife and Play Area
 Pinfold Cottage Woodland Park
 Kirkstone Park
 Hatton Hill Park
 Potters Barn
 Lonsdale Park
 Amos Square
 Liverpool Road Rec. Ground
 Canning Rd Rec. Ground
 Crossens Community Park
 Compton Road Park
Hightown Children's Park
Maghull Old Hall Site
Hall Rd Park/Merrilocks Road
Bowersdale Park
Rainbow Park

Wirral

List is referenced from Wirral Councils' website.

Arrowe Country Park
Ashton Park, West Kirby
Bidston Hill
Birkenhead Park
Central Park Wallasey
Coronation Gardens, West Kirby
Dibbinsdale Local Nature Reserve
Eastham Country Park
Heswall Dales
Hilbre Islands
Royden Park
Stapledon Woods and Caldy Hill
Vale Park
Victoria and Mersey Parks
Wirral Country Park
North Wirral Coastal Park

References

External links 
Sefton Council
Wirral Council
Knowsley Council
Liverpool City Council